Baatarzorig Batjargal (Mongolian: Батжаргалын Баатарзориг) is a Mongolian painter "who draws on the techniques of Mongol Zurag painting to address the broader history of Mongolia’s development over the past century". His artistic process includes his collection of various objects such as nomadic heirlooms and metal decorations which he often uses as a canvas for his paintings.

Life and education 
Baatarzorig Batjargal was born in 1983 in Ulaanbaatar, Mongolia. He studied Mongol Zurag (BA) at the University of Arts and Culture, Ulaanbaatar and graduated in 2005. He is a member of Union of Mongolian Artists (UMA), Mongol Zurag Society and Global Artist Pension Trust. He is married to a fellow artist Nomin Bold.

Notable exhibitions

Solo exhibitions 
2019   Wolf Totem, at Jack Bell Gallery, London, UK

2018   White Lion, at Jack Bell Gallery, London, UK

2017   Red Hero, at Jack Bell Gallery, London, UK

2014   The One, at Art Space 976+, Ulaanbaatar, Mongolia

Group exhibitions 
2019   Contemporary Art of Mongolia, at Areteos Art Space — G4, Hong Kong

2018   Second Yinchuan Biennale, at MOCA Yinchuan, China

2018   Urban Nomadism, at Boxes Art Museum, Foshan, China

2017   Beyond Heaven and Earth, at China Art Museum, Shanghai, China

2016   Asia Pacific Triennial, at Queensland, Australia

2015   Modern Transformations-New Identities, at Nord Art, Germany

2015   Contemporary Mongol Zurag, at Art Space 976+, Ulaanbaatar, Mongolia

References

External links 

 https://976artgallery.com/baatarzorig-batjargal/
 https://hifructose.com/2018/08/08/baatarzorig-batjargals-contemporary-mongol-zurag-paintings/

1983 births
Living people
People from Ulaanbaatar
Mongolian painters